Paul Malvine Starnes (December 31, 1934 – January 9, 2015) was an American politician in the state of Tennessee. He attended Central High School, Hiwassee College, Tennessee Wesleyan College, and the University of Chattanooga. Starnes served in the Tennessee House of Representatives as a Democrat from the 31st District from 1972 to 1990. He was preceded in office by Republican Granville Hinton, and succeeded by Kenneth J. Meyer. A native of Chattanooga, Tennessee, he previously worked in the Hamilton County Department of Education. He died on January 9, 2015, aged 80.

References

1934 births
2015 deaths
Politicians from Chattanooga, Tennessee
Democratic Party members of the Tennessee House of Representatives
Hiwassee College alumni
Tennessee Wesleyan University alumni
University of Tennessee at Chattanooga alumni
20th-century American politicians